DuPont Danisco Cellulosic Ethanol LLC is a 50/50 joint venture between DuPont and Genencor, a subsidiary of Danisco. The company is accelerating development and deployment of cellulosic ethanol, which is made from non-food biomass. DDCE plans to license its technology and also will engage in limited operations of cellulosic ethanol biorefineries.

The company's collaborations include work with Genera Energy and the University of Tennessee Research Foundation DDCE has constructed a demonstration-scale biorefinery and research and development facility for cellulosic ethanol in Vonore, Tennessee. The plant went into operation at the end of 2009.

DDCE was founded in 2008, but was eventually dissolved in 2011  due to the acquisition of Danisco by DuPont.

References

External links
DuPont Danisco Cellulosic Ethanol LLC

Alcohol fuel producers
DuPont subsidiaries
American companies established in 2008
Biotechnology companies established in 2008
Itasca, Illinois
2008 establishments in Illinois
Companies based in DuPage County, Illinois
Joint ventures
Biotechnology companies of the United States